Brian Smith (12 September 1955 – August 2013) was an English professional footballer who played as a midfielder.

Playing career
Born in Bolton, Smith played for Bolton Wanderers, Bradford City, Tulsa Roughnecks, Blackpool, Bournemouth, Bury and Salisbury.

He joined Bradford City on loan from Bolton in October 1977, and left in December 1977. For them he made 8 appearances in the Football League.

Managerial career
Smith was appointed manager of Atherton Collieries in June 1998, but resigned in September the same year. He also served as assistant manager at Ashton Town and Daisy Hill.

Death
Smith's death was announced on 3 September 2013. He had died the previous month at the age of 57, following a brief illness.

Sources

References

1955 births
2013 deaths
English footballers
Bolton Wanderers F.C. players
Bradford City A.F.C. players
Blackpool F.C. players
AFC Bournemouth players
Bury F.C. players
Salisbury City F.C. players
English Football League players
Place of death missing
Footballers from Bolton
Association football midfielders
English expatriate footballers
Tulsa Roughnecks (1978–1984) players
North American Soccer League (1968–1984) players
English expatriate sportspeople in the United States
Expatriate soccer players in the United States
Atherton Collieries A.F.C. managers
English football managers